Eric Ernest Unger (December 28, 1926 –  March 28, 2018) was a Canadian ice hockey player with the East York Lyndhursts. He won a silver medal at the 1954 World Ice Hockey Championships in Stockholm, Sweden. He also played professionally with the Philadelphia Rockets, Springfield Indians, Fort Worth Rangers, Vancouver Canucks of the PCHL, and Oakland Oaks. He died in 2018.

References

1926 births
2018 deaths
Canadian ice hockey centres
East York Lyndhursts players
Oakland Oaks (PCHL) players